Castiel may refer to:
Castiel (Supernatural), angel in the television series Supernatural
Castiel, Switzerland, a Swiss municipality
Castiel, literally meaning "My cover is God" or "Shield of God" in theophory in the Bible

See also
 Cassiel, an angel appearing in several extracanonical works
 Castile (disambiguation)